This is a list of seasons completed by the Portland Trail Blazers of the National Basketball Association. In the team's 51 years of existence (through 2021), the Blazers have qualified for the NBA playoffs 37 times.  This includes a streak of 21 straight playoff appearances from 1983 through 2003. The team has one NBA title, in 1977, and appeared in the NBA Finals two other times, in 1990 and 1992; they are the only team in NBA history to win a championship in their franchise's first-ever visit to the postseason.  The best record posted by the team was 63–19, in 1991; the worst record was 18–64, in the team's second season.

Seasons

All-time records
Note: Statistics are correct as of the end of the 2021-22 season

Notes

References

External links
Portland Trail Blazers Franchise History at Basketball Reference

 
seasons
Events in Portland, Oregon